Rosanna Fratello (born 26 March 1951) is an Italian singer and actress.

Biography and career
Born in San Severo, Foggia, Fratello emerged as singer in 1969, when she took part at the Sanremo Music Festival with the song "Il treno" and obtained her first commercial success with the song "Non sono Maddalena". 

In 1971, she made her debut as actress with the film Sacco e Vanzetti; for her performance she was awarded with a Nastro d'Argento as best new actress. Her other roles were in the crime films The Black Hand (1973) and Cross Shot (1976). 

In 1972, she topped the Hit Parade with her major success, the song "Sono una donna, non sono una santa"; in the following years she experimented with various genres such as disco music, folk music and Italo disco and competed in a number of Sanremo Festivals, but failed to repeat that success. 

In 1985, Fratello took part in the musical project "Ro Bo T" together with Bobby Solo and Little Tony. In 1994, she came back to the Sanremo Music Festival with the supergroup Squadra Italia.

References

External links 

 
 Rosanna Fratello at Discogs

Living people
1951 births
Italian women singers
People from San Severo
Italian film actresses
Nastro d'Argento winners